The Feargus O'Connor Willden House, at 120 E. 1st South in Beaver, Utah, was built in 1884.  It was listed on the National Register of Historic Places in 1983.

It is a two-story hall and parlor plan brick house built mostly by stonemason James Boyter and finished by Feargus O'Connor Willden.

References

National Register of Historic Places in Beaver County, Utah
Victorian architecture in Utah
Houses completed in 1884